The orange spotted filefish or harlequin filefish, Oxymonacanthus longirostris, is a filefish in the family Monacanthidae found on coral reefs in the Indo-Pacific Oceans. The orangespotted filefish is a different species and refers to Cantherhines pullus.

The orange spotted filefish is pale blue with about eight longitudinal rows of orange-yellow patches.  In the wild it feeds almost exclusively on Acropora polyps.

In the aquarium
They are often offered for sale in the aquarium trade, but few survive long in captivity. They are difficult to maintain in an aquarium unless provided with live corals. They must be kept in species-specific tanks, or tanks with very passive tankmates such as seahorses or pipefish. They have been successfully bred in captivity.

In the wild
Orange spotted filefish absorb and use chemicals in the Acropora coral they eat to take on its smell, which cloaks them from natural predators like cod. In addition to this trait, not observed among other vertebrates, they also use visual camouflage.

References

External links
 
 
 

Monacanthidae
Fish described in 1801
Taxa named by Marcus Elieser Bloch